Paul Bouche is an Emmy award winning American television host, comedian, media personality and television producer. Paul is the host, creator and producer of a variety of television and radio programs and serves as CCO (Chief Creative Officer) of Astracanada Productions Inc. a Media Production Company based in Miami Florida since 1995.  Paul has worked as a TV and Radio Host and Comedian in the United States and Latin America, performing as a Stand Up Comedian and on air television and radio personality. He is best known for creating and hosting the television show A Oscuras Pero Encendidos from 1995 to 2001.  He launched "La Boca Loca de Paul," in 2007, a daily variety show originated in Miami which continues to air in syndication in various markets in the United States, Puerto Rico and Latin America.

Career
Paul produced and hosted A Oscuras Pero Encendidos (In The Dark But Turned On) from 1995 until 2001. It was the first Late Night Show specifically designed for the US Hispanic Market. In 1997, Paul received an Emmy Award from the National Academy of Television Arts and Sciences. After starting as a local Miami production, in 1998 Galavisión (Univision's cable network) signed a distribution deal to carry A Oscuras Pero Encendidos via cable TV to national Hispanic audiences in the United States.  In June 2000 the Telemundo Network signed the show for National TV broadcast in America and Puerto Rico. Led by Paul A Oscuras Pero Encendidos, spent 6 years on the air and generated over 1100 hours of entertainment content for Hispanics in America.

In 2020 In celebration of the 25th Anniversary of Astracanada Productions Inc Paul Launched their first exclusive You tube channel with daily clips from over 5000 hours of content owned by the company generated from 1995 till today.  In a little over one year the Youtube channel garnered over One Milion views having its largest share of audience with young viewers in the 18 to 34 demographic. 

In 2018, Paul developed and produced the Online and TV series OFFSIDE a TV Format created by Astracanada Productions.  OFFSIDE is a Sports Entertainment Late-night Variety Comedy Show. A mix of celebrity interviews, games, characters, discussion panels, comedy segments and over all fun.

In 2014, Paul was invited by the Association of Independent Commercial Producers AICP to co-dictate the seminar "Advertising and Entertainment: a combined world of ideas" 

In 2012, Paul conducted an international media seminar in San Jose, Costa Rica attended by 20 media companies 

In 2011, "La Boca Loca De Paul" launched nationally in the US and Puerto Rico through Mega TV. and in the Dominican Republic. The format was able to score top ratings for the station in the 18-49 and 25 to 54 demographics.

In 2009, he was tapped by Univision's sister Network Telefutura to help launch and co-host of the national TV gossip show entitled "La Tijera".

In 2007, Paul returned to television with "La Boca Loca De Paul" (Paul's Crazy Mouth) a daily(Monday-Friday)variety and comedy talk show. Since its inception the show generated substantial rating increases in its time period.

In 2006, Paul hosted the “Advertising Age Hispanic creative Advertising Awards” gala.

In 2004, Paul hosted the Spanish Language version of the hit British television comedy talk show “So Graham Norton” co-produced by So Television, Zeal Entertainment and Astracanada Productions Inc. in London.

In September 2001, Paul launched the national morning drive show "Arriba Con Paul" for the Radio Unica Network reaching 80% of the Hispanic Market in the United States.

In 2000, he launched the humorous talk show "Sobre Ruedas" for WQBA 1140AM, a Univision Radio station in the city of Miami.

Awards
Paul received an Emmy Award from the National Academy of Television Arts and Sciences for television work in 1997.

He received the Keyes to the City of Miami in 1998.

In 1999 US Congresswoman Ileana Ros-Lehtinen recognized Paul with the US Capitol Flag in recognition of his contributions to the industry of Spanish Language TV in America.

Notes

References

La Boca Loca de Paul Official website/
Astracanada Productions Official website/
http://www.rafaelmartel.com/paul-bouche-gives-us-a-mouthful/
https://archive.today/20130126040454/http://www.hispanicbusiness.com/news/newsbyid.asp?id=75546
http://southflorida.bizjournals.com/southflorida/stories/1997/03/03/newscolumn4.html?jst=cn_cn_lk
http://harvardindy.wordpress.com/2007/06/23/jaime-bayly-we-at-the-indy-want-to-hate-you-too/
http://www.accessmylibrary.com/premium/0286/0286-7277592.html
http://www.imdb.com/name/nm1658728/
http://www.youtube.com/channel/UClycG0i_Vovgze03vk00XhQ

Living people
American male comedians
21st-century American comedians
American entertainers
American television hosts
People from Miami
People from San Juan, Puerto Rico
1970 births
Television producers from Florida